Council (Inupiaq: Kaułiq or Akauchak) is an abandoned townsite in the Nome Census Area in the U.S. state of Alaska. It has a population of zero as of the 2000 and 2010 U.S. Censuses.

Geography 

It is located on the banks of the Niukluk River on the central Seward Peninsula.

History 
Council was built in 1897 and 1898 when gold was discovered near the Ophir Creek. Council may have had as many as 15,000 inhabitants during those years. The residents left to work larger discoveries of gold near Nome around 1900. Council has about 25 old buildings and much old mining equipment, including a dredge, laying about. During the summer, Council is used as a fish camp and a recreational location for residents of Nome and White Mountain.

Council is connected to Nome by a gravel road, the Nome-Council Road. The road is closed during winter. Council is the nearest site to Nome that has trees, and some Nome residents cut spruce trees at Council for use as Christmas trees.

A second, larger, dredge is located at 15 Mile Camp on Ophir Creek.  There are several mine buildings on the site, including a powerhouse with a moderate diameter Pelton (undershot) waterwheel.  A number of new buildings have been added in recent years, mostly for summer second-home usage.  Occasionally one or two people winter at Council. In the Fall of 2004 the telephone lines which had not been used since a brief period of re-habitation in the 1970s were removed by the utility.  Utility poles remain in place with wires connecting to a defunct power plant from the same period.

Demographics

Council first appeared on the 1910 U.S. Census as Council City, although it was an unincorporated village. In 1920, the name was shortened to Council. It did not appear on the 1930 census, but returned again in 1940 and 1950. It did not appear again until 1990 when it was classified an Alaska Native Village Statistical Area (ANVSA). It has reported a population of zero in 2000 and 2010.

References

Geography of Nome Census Area, Alaska
Ghost towns in Alaska
Mining communities in Alaska
Geography of the Seward Peninsula
Populated places established in 1897
Ghost towns in the United States
Ghost towns in North America
Towns in the United States